The 1906 Rhode Island gubernatorial election was held on November 6, 1906. Democratic nominee James H. Higgins defeated incumbent Republican George H. Utter with 49.92% of the vote.

General election

Candidates
Major party candidates
James H. Higgins, Democratic 
George H. Utter, Republican

Other candidates
Bernan E. Helme, Prohibition
Warren A. Carpenter, Socialist
David J. Moran, Socialist Labor

Results

References

1906
Rhode Island
Gubernatorial